Mechetlino (Mäsetle) is a rural locality (a selo) and the administrative centre of Mechetlinsky Selsoviet, Salavatsky District, Bashkortostan, Russia. The population was 713 as of 2010. There are 6 streets.

Geography 
Mechetlino is located 25 km north of Maloyaz (the district's administrative centre) by road. Kusepeyevo is the nearest rural locality.

References 

Rural localities in Salavatsky District